The Sutter Avenue–Rutland Road station is a station on the IRT New Lots Line of the New York City Subway, located at the intersection of Sutter Avenue, Rutland Road, and East 98th Street at the border of East Flatbush and Brownsville, Brooklyn. It is served by the 3 train at all times except late nights, when the 4 train takes over service. During rush hours, occasional 2, 4 and 5 trains also stop here.

History
The New Lots Line was built as a part of Contract 3 of the Dual Contracts between New York City and the Interborough Rapid Transit Company, including this station. It was built as an elevated line because the ground in this area is right above the water table, and as a result the construction of a subway would have been prohibitively expensive. The first portion of the line between Utica Avenue and Junius Street, including this station, opened on November 22, 1920, with shuttle trains operating over this route. The line was completed to New Lots Avenue on October 16, 1922, with a two-car train running on the northbound track. On October 31, 1924, through service to New Lots Avenue began.

From October 5, 2016, to June 19, 2017, this station and Junius Street were closed for renovations.

Station layout

This elevated station has two side platforms and two tracks with space for a center track that was never added. The middle third of both platforms have beige windscreens and brown canopies supported by green frames and support columns. The remaining two-thirds have black, waist-high steel fences with lampposts at regular intervals. The station signs are in the standard black name plates in white lettering.

This is the northernmost station on the IRT New Lots Line. To the north, the line curves west under Eastern Parkway and goes underground to become the IRT Eastern Parkway Line. The Manhattan-bound track goes underneath the New Lots Avenue-bound track on the south side of the IRT Eastern Parkway Line. A center track begins at a bumper block near the tunnel portal and merges with the two express tracks of the Eastern Parkway line south of Utica Avenue.

Exits
This station has one elevated station house beneath the platforms and tracks. Two staircases from the center of each platform go down to a waiting area/crossunder, where a turnstile bank provides access to/from the station. Outside fare control, there is a token booth and two staircases facing in opposite directions going down to the east side of East 98th Street at the T-intersection of Rutland Road. The north staircase is near the southern corner of the T-intersection of Sutter Avenue and East 98th Street. A third staircase goes down to the northwest corner of East 98th Street and Rutland Road.

References

External links 
 
 
 Station Reporter — 3 Train

IRT New Lots Line stations
Brownsville, Brooklyn
East Flatbush, Brooklyn
New York City Subway stations in Brooklyn
Railway stations in the United States opened in 1920
1920 establishments in New York City